Australia competed at the 1976 Winter Olympics in Innsbruck, Austria.
Colin Coates' sixth place in 10000 metres speed skating was Australia's best result so far at the Winter Olympics.

Alpine skiing

Men

Women

Figure skating

Speed skating

See also
Australia at the Winter Olympics

References

External links
Australia NOC
Olympic Winter Institute of Australia
"Australians at the Olympics: A definitive history" by Gary Lester  (suspected errata listed in Errata/0949853054)
"2002 Australian Winter Olympic Team Guide" PDF file
"The Compendium: Official Australian Olympic Statistics 1896-2002" Australian Olympic Committee  (Inconsistencies in sources mentioned in Wikibooks:Errata/0702234257)
"Winter Olympic Representatives 1924 - 2002" Ice Skating Australia

Nations at the 1976 Winter Olympics
1976
Winter sports in Australia
1976 in Australian sport